Scum is an upcoming multiplayer online survival game, developed by Croatian studio Gamepires, available under the Steam Early Access program. The game is described as a "prison riot survival game" and will feature an open world. It entered Steam's early access program on 29 August 2018, with a full release initially scheduled for sometime in 2021. , the game is still in early access. The game uses Unreal Engine 4.

Gameplay

The gameplay takes place in Croatia where up to 80 players per server will attempt to survive and get off the island by first removing the implant which prevents them from leaving. The player will earn fame points through participation in various action-driven events or simply by surviving in a hostile environment. These fame points allow the player to be cloned back in case of death, and used as currency to purchase or trade in various safe zones. Players will be able to fortify existing structures and points in order to secure positions or store items when needed.

Characters possess four main attributes: strength, dexterity, constitution, and intelligence. These help players create characters to suit their preferred playing style. It aims to simulate the human body, and thus has an interface called the "BCU monitor" to track character's calories, vitamins, health, and other stats. Players can choose to ignore these elements of the game, or can delve deep into these systems in order to improve the character's performance (speed, stamina, carry weight and so on). Another aspect is digestion; for instance, if a character gets all of their teeth knocked out, they will have to find a way to liquefy food to digest it. Toilet activities leave physical evidence that could be used to track that player. Aspects such as combat depend on the player's own skill, but also are affected by stamina, health, and so on. Wetness, smell, medicine, cooking, hacking, crafting, hunting, and poison also play a major role in the gameplay.

Players can easily alternate between third and first-person perspectives, yet prevents third-person peeking by hiding anything not visible from the first-person.

SCUM also offers a realistic nightvision that simulates photons hitting the lenses and the infrared light emitting from the goggles.

Development
Scum was first announced in August 2016. The game was released into early access on August 29, 2018, its current stage is 0.8 and is currently half way to its release.

Reception
The game was named as one of the best indie games of PAX East 2018 by Game Informer. It received similar attention from GameSpot, listing it as among the most noteworthy games of PAX East 2018. The game sold over 250,000 copies within its first 24 hours in early access, 700,000 in its first week, and over one million sales by the third week.

References

External links
 

Upcoming video games
Early access video games
Multiplayer video games
Open-world video games
Survival video games
Tactical shooter video games
Third-person shooters
Unreal Engine games
Video games developed in Croatia
Video games set on fictional islands
Windows games
Windows-only games
Devolver Digital games
Video games set in Croatia